Said Kheireddine Arroussi (born July 23, 1991 in Sétif) is an Algerian footballer who plays as a centre-back for Algerian Ligue Professionnelle 1 club CA Bordj Bou Arréridj.

Club career

In December 2014, Arroussi was a member of the ES Sétif squad that participated in the 2014 FIFA Club World Cup in Morocco, starting in both of Sétif's matches in the competition. Two months later, in February 2015, he was a starter in Sétif's CAF Super Cup triumph over Egypt's Al Ahly, playing the entire match.

Honours

Club
ES Sétif
 CAF Champions League: 2014
 CAF Super Cup: 2015
 Algerian Ligue Professionnelle 1: 2014–15, 2016–17

CS Constantine
 Algerian Ligue 1 (1): 2017–18

References

External links
 
 

1991 births
Algerian footballers
Algerian Ligue Professionnelle 1 players
ES Sétif players
Living people
Footballers from Sétif
Association football defenders
21st-century Algerian people